There have been five baronetcies of the United Kingdom created for a person with the surname Erskine, two in the Baronetage of Nova Scotia, one in the Baronetage of Great Britain and two in the Baronetage of the United Kingdom. Two of the creations are extant as of 2010.

The Erskine Baronetcy, of Alva in the County of Fife, was created in the Baronetage of Nova Scotia on 30 April 1666 for Charles Erskine. The third Baronet was one of the Scottish representatives to the 1st Parliament of Great Britain and also represented Clackmannanshire. The fourth Baronet was killed in action at the Battle of Lauffeld in 1747. The fifth Baronet sat as Member of Parliament for Ayr Burghs and Anstruther Easter Burghs. He married Janet, daughter of Peter Wedderburn (a Lord of Session under the judicial title of Lord Chesterhall) and sister of Alexander Wedderburn, 1st Earl of Rosslyn. Their son, the sixth Baronet, succeeded to the earldom of Rosslyn in 1805 according to a special remainder in the letters patent. For further history of the baronetcy, see Earl of Rosslyn.

The Erskine Baronetcy, of Cambo in the County of Fife, was created in the Baronetage of Nova Scotia on 20 August 1666 for Charles Erskine. He was a younger brother of Alexander Erskine, 3rd Earl of Kellie. The second Baronet sat as Member of Parliament for Fife. The eighth Baronet succeeded to the earldom of Kellie in 1797. The baronetcy remained a subsidiary title of the earldom until the baronetcy's extinction in 1829.

The Erskine Baronetcy, of Torrie in the County of Fife, was created in the Baronetage of Great Britain on 28 July 1791 for the soldier William Erskine. He was the son of Colonel the Hon. William Erskine, younger son of David Erskine, 2nd Lord Cardross (see Earl of Buchan). His eldest son, the second Baronet, was also a prominent soldier. The latter's two younger brothers, the third and fourth Baronets, both succeeded in the title. The title became extinct on the death of the fourth Baronet in 1836.

The Erskine Baronetcy, of Cambo in the County of Fife, was created in the Baronetage of the United Kingdom on 27 August 1821 for David Erskine. He was the natural grandson of Thomas Erskine, 9th Earl of Kellie. The original baronetcy of Cambo became extinct on the death of the tenth Earl of Kellie in 1829. The second Baronet was a Deputy Lieutenant of Denbighshire. The third Baronet was a Deputy Lieutenant of Fife. The fifth Baronet was Convenor of the Fife County Council between 1970 and 1973 and Vice-Lord Lieutenant of Fife between 1981 and 1987. The title has descended in a direct line from father to son.

Sir James Malcolm Monteith Erskine, second son of Captain David Holland Erskine, second son of the first Baronet, sat as Member of Parliament for Westminster St George's. His son Sir Derek Quick Erskine (1905–1977) was a member of the Legislative Council of Kenya.

The Erskine Baronetcy, of Rerrick, was created in the Baronetage of the United Kingdom on 5 July 1961. For more information on this creation, see Baron Erskine of Rerrick.

Erskine baronets, of Alva (1666)
Sir Charles Erskine, 1st Baronet (1643–1690)
Sir James Erskine, 2nd Baronet (–1693)
Sir John Erskine, 3rd Baronet (1672–1739)
Sir Charles Erskine, 4th Baronet (born 7 May 1709 died 2 July 1747)
Sir Henry Erskine, 5th Baronet (c. 1710–1765)
Sir James Erskine, 6th Baronet (1762–1837) (succeeded as Earl of Rosslyn in 1805)

Erskine baronets, of Cambo (1666)
Sir Charles Erskine, 1st Baronet (c. 1620–1677), Lord Lyon
Sir Alexander Erskine, 2nd Baronet (c. 1663–1727), Lord Lyon
Sir Charles Erskine, 3rd Baronet (died 1753), Bute Pursuivant then Lyon Clerk and Keeper of the Records
Sir John Erskine, 4th Baronet (died 1754)
Sir William Erskine, 5th Baronet (died 1780)
Sir Charles Erskine, 6th Baronet (died 1790)
Sir William Erskine, 7th Baronet (died 1791)
Sir Charles Erskine, 8th Baronet (1764–1799)
see Earl of Kellie for further history

Erskine baronets, of Torrie (1791)
Sir William Erskine, 1st Baronet (1728–1795)
Sir William Erskine, 2nd Baronet (1770–1813)
Sir James Erskine, 3rd Baronet (1772–1825)
Sir John Drummond Erskine, 4th Baronet (1776–1836)

Erskine baronets, of Cambo (1821)
Sir David Erskine, 1st Baronet (1792–1841)
Sir Thomas Erskine, 2nd Baronet (1824–1902)
Sir ffolliott Williams Erskine, 3rd Baronet (1850–1912)
Lt.-Col. Sir Thomas Wilfrid Hargreaves John Erskine, DSO, 4th Baronet (1880–1944)
Sir (Thomas) David Erskine, 5th Baronet (1912–2007)
Sir Thomas Peter Neil Erskine, 6th Baronet (born 1950)

The heir apparent to the baronetcy is Thomas Struan Erskine (born 1977), eldest son of the 6th Baronet.

Erskine baronets, of Rerrick (1961)
see Baron Erskine of Rerrick

See also
Earl of Kellie
Erskine-Hill baronets

Notes

References 
Kidd, Charles, Williamson, David (editors). Debrett's Peerage and Baronetage (1990 edition). New York: St Martin's Press, 1990, 

Baronetcies in the Baronetage of Nova Scotia
Extinct baronetcies in the Baronetage of Nova Scotia
1666 establishments in Nova Scotia
1791 establishments in Great Britain
1821 establishments in the United Kingdom
Legislative Council of Kenya
Extinct baronetcies in the Baronetage of Great Britain
Baronetcies in the Baronetage of the United Kingdom
Extinct baronetcies in the Baronetage of the United Kingdom
Clan Erskine